= Kadhaiya =

- village
- Location within Madhya Pradesh Location within India
- Coordinates: 23.4246443°N 77.467329°E
- Country: India
- State: Madhya Pradesh
- District: Bhopal
- Tehsil: Huzur
- Elevation: 492 m (1,614 ft)

Population (2011)
  - Total: 206
- Time zone: UTC+5:30 (IST)
- ISO 3166 code: MP-IN
- 2011 census code: 482401

Kadhaiya is a village in the Bhopal district of Madhya Pradesh, India. It is located in the Huzur tehsil and the Phanda block.

== Demographics ==
According to the 2011 census of India, Kadhaiya has 51 households. The effective literacy rate (i.e. the literacy rate of population excluding children aged 6 and below) is 67.44%.

Demographics (2011 Census)
	Total	Male	Female
Population	206	115	91
Children aged below 6 years	34	23	11
Scheduled caste	10	7	3
Scheduled tribe	64	35	29
Literates	116	73	43
Workers (all)	101	59	42
Main workers (total)	34	26	8
Main workers: Cultivators	18	15	3
Main workers: Agricultural labourers	4	3	1
Main workers: Household industry workers	1	0	1
Main workers: Other	11	8	3
Marginal workers (total)	67	33	34
Marginal workers: Cultivators	17	7	10
Marginal workers: Agricultural labourers	49	26	23
Marginal workers: Household industry workers	0	0	0
Marginal workers: Others	1	0	1
Non-workers	105	56	49
